Bisdemethoxycurcumin is a curcuminoid found (along with the curcuminoids curcumin and demethoxycurcumin) in turmeric (Curcuma longa), but absent in Javanese turmeric (Curcuma xanthorrhiza). Bisdemethoxycurcumin is used as a pigment and nutraceutical with antimutagenic properties. All three of the curcuminoids found in Curcuma longa have been shown to have antioxidant properties, but bisdemethoxycurcumin is more resistant than the others to alkaline degradation. It was found to be effective in sensitizing PC cells resistance against gemcitabine.

See also 
 Curcumin
 Desmethoxycurcumin

References

External links 

Curcuminoids
Food colorings
Phenolic dietary antioxidants
Vinylogous carboxylic acids